"Si Tú Te Atreves" (Eng.: If You Dare) is a song written and produced by Manuel Alejandro and performed and produced by Luis Miguel. It was released as the first single from the album Complices. It is a romantic ballad about an intense and impossible love.

Song information
The track was first played on March 30, 2008, in the United States in the show "Reporte Última Palabra" and the next day on "El Show de Piolín", one of the highest-rated radio shows for the Latin community.

Video information
The premiere of the music video was set on April 27, 2008, on the Latin cable channel Sony Entertainment Television at 10:00 pm EST. The video was directed by Rebecca Blake, and the shooting took place in Los Angeles, California in March 2008.

Chart performance
The track debuted in the United States Billboard Hot Latin Tracks chart at number 23 on April 19, 2008., peaking so far at number 12.

Charts

Weekly charts

Year-end charts

Certifications

References

External links
 

2008 singles
Luis Miguel songs
Songs written by Manuel Alejandro
Spanish-language songs
Pop ballads
Warner Music Latina singles
2008 songs
2000s ballads
Song recordings produced by Luis Miguel